James Donald Hogan (born March 15, 1939) is an American politician from Georgia. Hogan is a Republican member of Georgia House of Representatives for District 179.

References

Republican Party members of the Georgia House of Representatives
21st-century American politicians
Living people
1939 births